Black Hawk Down is the soundtrack accompanying the 2001 film of the same name. The original score was composed by Hans Zimmer. The music was written in collaboration with several other musicians (including Martin Tillmann, Craig Eastman, Heitor Pereira and Mel Wesson) in what was referred to as "The War Room" at the Media Ventures studios. Based on jam sessions that were later edited to match the pictures, the score was produced within a few weeks. Because the end result was very experimental, Zimmer was afraid there would not be much music suitable for a listening experience on compact disc. The soundtrack disc was released on January 15, 2002.

Overview
To prepare for the film, composer Hans Zimmer sent then-assistant Marc Streitenfeld to scout various instruments and sounds native to the deserts of Africa. Additionally, several musicians from around the world worked with Zimmer to develop the soundtrack. Among these musicians was Senegalese vocalist Baaba Maal, whose typically positive sound was used in contrast with the film's content, and Denez Prigent, a Breton singer interpreting Gortoz a ran ("I await") with Lisa Gerrard.

Track listing

References

External links
 
 Black Hawk Down soundtrack at Filmtracks

Hans Zimmer soundtracks
2002 soundtrack albums
2000s film soundtrack albums